Eremothamnus marlothianus is a species of shrub in the family Asteraceae, the only species in the genus Eremothamnus. It is native to the coastal desert of Namibia. It is a small shrub with spiny leaves.

Taxonomy and systematics
The genus Eremothamnus was erected in 1889 by Otto Hoffmann, when he named its only species, Eremothamnus marlothianus. The specific epithet is for Rudolf Marloth (1855–1931), a South African botanist, pharmacist, and analytical chemist. The generic name is derived from the Greek words eremos and thamnos. Hoffmann did not give an etymology for the name and it has been supposed that it means "solitary shrub", but "desert shrub" is also a possible interpretation.

Eremothamnus is closely related to Hoplophyllum. These two genera form a clade in the subfamily Cichorioideae. Little else can be said with confidence about their phylogenetic position. Some authors have placed Eremothamnus in the tribe Arctotideae. In some of the more recent classification systems, Eremothamnus and Hoplophyllum constitute the tribe Eremothamneae.

References

External links
 Eremothamnus established In: Bot. Jahrb. Syst.
 CRC World Dictionary of Plant Names: D–L
 Classification (compositae book, chapter 11), The International Compositae Alliance

Flora of Namibia
Least concern plants
Monotypic Asteraceae genera
Taxonomy articles created by Polbot
Asteraceae